Table tennis women's singles at the 2018 Commonwealth Games was held at the Oxenford Studios on the Gold Coast, Australia from 10 to 14 April.

Main draw

Finals

Top half

Section 1

Section 2

Bottom half

Section 3

Section 4

Preliminary stage

Group 1

Group 2

Group 3

Group 4

Group 5

Group 6

Group 7

Group 8

Group 9

Group 10

Group 11

References

Women's singles
Common